This is a list of episodes from the 1970s US series Starsky & Hutch.

Series overview

Episodes

Pilot movie

Season 1 (1975–76)

Season 2 (1976–77)

Season 3 (1977–78)

Season 4 (1978–79)

References

External links

Encyclopedia of Television

Lists of American crime drama television series episodes
Lists of American action television series episodes
Episodes